The 21st Mieczysław Połukard Criterium of Polish Speedway League Aces was the 2002 version of the Mieczysław Połukard Criterium of Polish Speedway Leagues Aces. It took place on March 26 in the Polonia Stadium in Bydgoszcz, Poland.

Starting positions draw 

 Piotr Protasiewicz - Point'S-Polonia Bydgoszcz
 Rafał Kurmański - ZKŻ Quick-Mix Zielona Góra
 Mirosław Kowalik - Apator-Adriana Toruń
 Grzegorz Walasek - Włókniarz-Candela Częstochowa
 Tomasz Gollob - Point'S-Polonia Bydgoszcz
 Robert Sawina - Apator-Adriana Toruń
 Krzysztof Cegielski - Wybrzeże Gdańsk
 Piotr Świst - Stal-Pergo Gorzów Wlkp.
 Andrzej Huszcza - ZKŻ Quick-Mix Zielona Góra
 Michał Robacki - Point'S-Polonia Bydgoszcz
 Tomasz Bajerski - Apator-Adriana Toruń
 Jacek Gollob - Point'S-Polonia Bydgoszcz
 Łukasz Stanisławski - Point'S-Polonia Bydgoszcz
 Sławomir Drabik - TŻ-Noban Opole
 Rafał Dobrucki - BGŻ S.A.-Polonia Piła
 Wiesław Jaguś - Apator-Adriana Toruń
 (R1) Robert Umiński - Point'S-Polonia Bydgoszcz
 (R2) Grzegorz Musiał - Point'S-Polonia Bydgoszcz

Heat details

Sources 
 Roman Lach - Polish Speedway Almanac

See also 

Criterium of Aces
Mieczysław Połukard Criterium of Polish Speedway Leagues Aces